The 1976 Utah gubernatorial election was held on November 2, 1976. Democratic candidate Scott M. Matheson defeated Republican nominee Vernon B. Romney, who had defeated Dixie L. Leavitt for his party's nomination, with 52.02% of the vote.

General election

Candidates
Scott M. Matheson, Democratic
Vernon B. Romney, Republican
L. S. Brown, American Party
Betty Bates, Concerned Citizens

Results

References

1976
Utah
Gubernatorial